Loitongbam Ashalata Devi (born 3 July 1993), known as Ashalata Devi, she is an Indian professional football player who plays as a defender, who currently captains both the Indian national team and Indian Women's League side Gokulam Kerala. Devi is considered one of the finest defenders from Asia.

Early life 
Devi was born in Imphal, Manipur on 3 July 1993. She started playing football at the age of 13.

Club career

New Radiant 
In 2015, Devi signed for the Dhivehi Women's Premier League franchise New Radiant W.S.C. She thus became the second Indian to play for a club outside India after Bembem Devi. She won the league with the club in that particular season.

Rising Student Club 
On 2016, Devi signed for the newly formed Rising Student Club to feature in the first edition of Indian Women's League.

KRYPHSA FC 
On 2017, Devi signed for the Indian Women's League side KRYPHSA F.C. for the 2017–18 Indian Women's League season.

Sethu FC 
On 2018, Devi shifted her base to Tamil Nadu based club Sethu FC who participates in Indian Women's League. In the 2018–19 Indian Women's League season, Sethu won the tournament by defeating Manipur Police SC 1–3 in the finals thereby winning her maiden Indian Women's League trophy.

International career 
In 2008 at the age of 15, Devi was called-up for India U17. Devi was called-up for the senior team and debuted in the year of 2011. She is the current captain India women's national football team. Devi played a pivotal role in India's success in qualifying for the 2021 Olympics (supposed to be held in 2020) which is going to be held in Tokyo. Devi has several achievements with the national team. Devi was a part of India that won two South Asian Games gold medals starting from 2016 and in 2019 and was also part of the team that won SAFF Women's Championship four consecutive times starting from 2012, 2014, 2016 and finally in 2019. She was nominated by AFC for the women's player of the year in 2019 and was selected as AIFF women's player of the year for her performance in the 2018–19 campaign.

International goals

Honours

India
SAFF Women's Championship: 2012, 2014, 2016, 2019
South Asian Games Gold medal: 2016, 2019

Sethu FC
Indian Women's League: 2018–19

Gokulam Kerala
Indian Women's League: 2021–22

Railways
 Senior Women's National Football Championship: 2015–16

New Radiant WSC
FAM Women's Football Championship: 2015

Individual
 Indian Women's League Best Defender: 2021–22
 AIFF women's player of the year: 2018–19
 AFC women's player of the year 2019: Nominee

See also
List of Indian football players in foreign leagues

References

External links 
 Loitongbam Ashalata Devi at All India Football Federation
 
 Loitongbam Ashalata Devi at Eurosport

Indian women's footballers
1993 births
Living people
Footballers from Manipur
People from Imphal
India women's international footballers
India women's youth international footballers
Footballers at the 2014 Asian Games
Indian expatriate women's footballers
Expatriate women's footballers in the Maldives
Women's association football central defenders
Sportswomen from Manipur
21st-century Indian women
21st-century Indian people
Kryphsa F.C. Players
Sethu FC players
Gokulam Kerala FC Women players
Indian Women's League players
Asian Games competitors for India
South Asian Games gold medalists for India
South Asian Games medalists in football